Sergey Vasilyevich Zhenovach (born May 15, 1957, Potsdam, GDR) is a Soviet and Russian theater director, teacher, рrofessor. Founder and artistic Director Of the Studio Of Theatrical Art since 2005. Artistic Director of the Chekhov Moscow Art Тheatre on March 23, 2018 until October 27, 2021.

Honored art worker of the Russian Federation. Laureate of the State Prize of the Russian Federation (2004). The Winner of the Golden Mask.

References

External links 
 С. В. Женовач на сайте СТИ
 Пресс-портрет С. В. Женовача

1957 births
Living people
People from Potsdam
Soviet theatre directors
Recipients of the Order of Honour (Russia)
State Prize of the Russian Federation laureates
Russian Academy of Theatre Arts alumni
Theatre directors from Moscow